Queen Clea is a fictional character appearing in DC Comics publications and related media, commonly as a recurring adversary of the superhero Wonder Woman. The ruthless dictator of Venturia, a remote kingdom on the sunken continent of Atlantis, she first appeared in 1944's Wonder Woman (volume 1) #8, written by Wonder Woman creator William Moulton Marston and illustrated by Harry G. Peter. After several clashes with Wonder Woman, she became a member of Villainy Inc., supervillain team consisting of several of Wonder Woman's Golden Age foes, including the Cheetah, Giganta, and Doctor Poison. She made several Silver Age appearances (including one in Justice League of America #135 in 1976 in which she allied with Batman's enemies the Penguin and Blockbuster, along with the Captain Marvel foe Ibac), as well as several Post-Crisis appearances in which she was the leader of Villainy Inc.

Fictional character biography

Golden Age

As Queen of a crumbling Atlantean outpost named Venturia, Queen Clea enslaved the men of her realm and amused herself by putting many to death in gladiatorial combat. Wanting to extend her rule, Clea repeatedly attacked Venturia's flourishing sister city of Aurania, though unsuccessfully. Despite this failure she expanded her ideas towards domination over the entire lost continent of Atlantis. In 1944, it was said that Queen Clea reigns over Aurania - and it is possible that she has been Queen for quite a long time. Though Aurania has long been overshadowed by their Venturian rival, the ruthless Clea planned and executed a surprise attack that caught the Venturian military cold, and Aurania conquered and occupied Venturia. No explanation is given for this switch.

Venturian queen Eeras managed to flee and went to the surface world where she adventured for some months, trying to find some sort of weapon to repulse the Auranian. She focused on a chemical invented by one Van Vlek; working the trail to that secret formula she ended up in Dakar where she met American military intelligence agent Steve Trevor. Pooling their resources they secured the whole formula, and Eeras asked Trevor to fly her to Atlantis on his way back to the US. Trevor, who assumed that she was a lunatic, accepted; not expecting to fly into an actual access to Atlantis he had to land in less-than- perfect conditions and they were captured by Auranian troops.

Wonder Woman came to the rescue, forging an alliance with Queen Eeras as both an Amazon and an American. Clea was, of course, busy throwing Trevor into the arena to fight prehistoric boars; Wonder Woman fought everybody off and Eeras successfully used the "devitamizer" derived from the Van Vlek formula to make all Auranians present collapse.

The Auranian prisoners recovered, and Clea had her daughter Ptra replace her as a prisoner - which was facilitated since the Venturians kept their prisoner in an iron mask that allowed her to eat and drink but prevented her speaking. Clea covertly rebuilt Aurania's power. Probably inspired by Eeras's previous strategy, she formed a band of Auranian pirates who attacked surface world ships - using blasts of air from the volcano to soar on parachutes and board nearby ships, sword in hand.

Clea was especially interested in getting herself some of the bigger, stronger and smarter manlings of the surface world, and soon struck a deal with a ship full of German prisoners who were being deported to America for farm work. As the German soldiers, equipped with local swords and shields, attacked the Venturians, Clea personally sneaked behind enemy lines to get the "devitamizer" that had previously felled her, then brought down the Venturian forces and Eeras. Thankfully Wonder Woman, Steve Trevor and the Holliday Girls were present to investigate the fate of the kidnapped American sailors. Wonder Woman and Eela were gassed and Wonder Woman was bound with her lasso, then the two women were covered with iron. Despite it being three inches thick, Wonder Woman broke free and freed herself and other prisoners. They freed everyone, then captured Clea and Ptra.

Queen Eeras, being reluctant to execute prisoners, agreed to hand Clea and Ptra over to the Amazons. The incorrigible Clea soon managed to escape, when fighting Octavia, daughter of Eeras when Wonder Woman wanted her to play bullets and bracelets with her. She fired early, grazing Octavia's skull, then knocked out Wonder Woman from behind. She bound the girls, and with her prisoners returned to Atlantis. However, when she landed in Atlantis, she discovered that there had been a revolution and that the inept manlings had taken over thanks to surprise and a stockpile of captured surface world weapons which had not been used by the more traditionalist female rulers. Wonder Woman and Octavia escaped and made contact with Steve Trevor and the Holliday Girls, who had been flying nearby looking for them. In the meanwhile Clea managed to convince the stupid manling king to let her rule but it was too late, and her manlings were dispersed by the Holliday Girls. Clea was captured anew and again imprisoned by the Amazons.

Some months later, the Saturnic slaves-driver Eviless escaped from her cell on Paradise Island and assembled a gang of prisoners, called Villainy, Inc. Clea was a part of it. Villainy, Inc. did take over Paradise Island, but were soon repulsed by Wonder Woman. Still, Clea took Giganta with her and managed to flee - and they stole a huge chest filled with Amazon jewels, too.

Clea tried to anonymously buy a submarine from Steve Trevor to return to Atlantis (why she needed a sub is unclear, possibly she wanted the weaponry on board), but Trevor recognised her and played along to capture her. He was knocked out by Giganta, and Clea and her aide decided to capture the Holliday Girls and maybe Wonder Woman to force him to give them a submarine. This sort of worked, and they forced Wonder Woman to steal a US Navy sub for them - but Clea and Giganta were recaptured before their sub could fully dive, and reimprisoned by the Amazons.

Bronze Age

In a later story, Clea stole the fabled Trident of Poseidon to make herself virtually unstoppable. She allied with King Kull and his agents against the Justice League and Justice Society when he plans to wipe out life on Earth-One, Earth-Two, and Earth-S so his subjugated Beast-men can rule once again. On Earth-Two with Penguin of Earth-One, Blockbuster of Earth-One, and Ibac of Earth-S, she attempts to take over the recently-risen Atlantis. The Earth-One Superman, Earth-One Green Arrow, Earth-S Spy Smasher, and Earth-Two Wonder Woman defeat the villains without much trouble, Wonder Woman beating Clea. A cloud is nearly used to make all land on Earth-Two sink, starting with a nearby island, but Superman stops it using his freezing breath, throws it on a comet, and Atlantis heads beneath the waves again.

Modern Age
When Clea took her battle to the surface world she battled against Queen Hippolyta, who was acting as Wonder Woman in the 1940s, and was defeated. Clea then teamed with the original Villainy Inc. in order to overtake Hippolyta but this did not work out either. A new version of the team was assembled in modern times in the hopes of finishing where her plans left off. Invading the hidden nation of Skartaris, Clea did succeed in ruling the land for a limited time. Both versions of the team were defeated by Wonder Woman. In one instance Clea's own daughter, Ptra, helped Wonder Woman defeat her mother.

Clea later appears as part of a large team of super-villains assigned to kill Wonder Woman. She is once again in possession of the Trident of Poseidon and appears to possess the power of flight. She explains that she, and her fellow cohorts, have had their abilities amplified by the witch Circe. She eventually is subdued by several of Wonder Woman's allies and taken into custody by Nemesis and the Department of Metahuman Affairs. As that agency was later destroyed, the present whereabouts of Queen Clea are not known.

During the Infinite Crisis storyline, Queen Clea popped up as a member of Alexander Luthor Jr.'s Secret Society of Super Villains.

Powers and abilities
As an Atlantean, Queen Clea can breathe both above and under water. Clea can also physically withstand the great amounts of undersea depth pressures. Because of this, her body is resistant to most physical injury and provides a form of super strength. When in possession of the mystical trident belonging to Poseidon, Clea's strength levels increase and she has limited control over water. The trident also has the ability to fire force blasts. Due to a spell by the witch Circe, Clea now also has the ability of flight. Also, as Clea was depicted as arguably young both in the 1940s while battling Hippolyta and around the same age when later battling Diana in modern times, it can be suggested that Clea either has a longer than average lifespan or is possibly immortal.

In other media
A character strikingly similar to Queen Clea appeared in "Return of Atlantis," a 1980 episode of Hannah-Barbera's popular Saturday morning animated television series Super Friends. Queen Ocina (voiced by Kathy Garver) is the ruler of an unnamed Atlantean city which, like Queen Clea's Venturia in the comics, is a misandrist society dominated by women. In the episode, she raises Atlantis to the surface of the ocean in a gambit to rule the world. With her army of women warriors, she attacks Washington, D.C., but is confronted by Wonder Woman and Rima the Jungle Girl. After a skirmish, Ocina defeats the pair and imprisons them, along with Aquaman, in an underwater dungeon. Wonder Woman sends a telepathic message to her mother Hippolyta, prompting the Amazon army to travel from Paradise Island to Washington and rescue the heroes. The combined efforts of Wonder Woman, Rima, Aquaman, Hippolyta and the Amazons halt Queen Ocina's plan and exile her and her forces back to the bottom of the ocean.

See also
 List of Wonder Woman enemies

References

External links
 Cosmic Teams Profile
 Queen Clea Profile
 
 Jett, Brett. "Who Is Wonder Woman?--Bonus", (2009): "Major Villains", 1–17.
 Marston, William Moulton. Emotions Of Normal People. London: Kegan Paul, Trench, Trübner & Co, Ltd. 1928. 
 The Unofficial Queen Clea Biography

Characters created by William Moulton Marston
Comics characters introduced in 1944
Clea
Clea
Clea
Clea
Fictional characters with superhuman durability or invulnerability
Clea
Golden Age supervillains
Wonder Woman characters